Edmund Dunch  may refer to:

 Sir Edmund Dunch (Elizabethan) (1551–1623), English politician, MP for Wallingford, then Berkshire in 1571 and later for Wootton Bassett (1584–1585) 
 Edmund Dunch (Roundhead) (1602–1678), English Member of Parliament who supported the Parliamentary
 Edmund Dunch (Whig) (1677–1719), English politician and courtier